Axel Alfredsson (2 May 1902 – 9 August 1966) was a Swedish association football player who won a bronze medal at the 1924 Summer Olympics. He played 31 international matches and scored no goals.

References

External links

1902 births
1966 deaths
Sportspeople from Helsingborg
Swedish footballers
Footballers at the 1924 Summer Olympics
Olympic footballers of Sweden
Olympic bronze medalists for Sweden
Sweden international footballers
Olympic medalists in football
Medalists at the 1924 Summer Olympics
Association football defenders
Helsingborgs IF players
AIK Fotboll players